= Danica Phelps =

- Born: 26 April 1971; New York City, US
- Education: Hampshire College (BFA), Rhode Island School of Design (MFA)
- Known for: Painting, drawing, writing, conceptual art

Danica Phelps (born April 26, 1971) is an American conceptual and visual artist.

== Work ==
Phelps began showing her work in New York City in 1995 after earning her MFA from the Rhode Island School of Design. She is well known for her pencil drawings, which are typically scenes taken from her own life. Through meticulous documentation of her everyday events, she has created an extensive body of work that explores her financial pitfalls and successes, her sexuality, and mundane everyday tasks. Her work is also often saturated with financial references, citing the value of her work as well as her student debt and foreclosure preceding. Her mother is a mathematician, which may explain some of her proclivity towards numbers. Her creative documentation is so detailed that it includes time spent walking her dog, having sex, any income earned, and every expenditure she makes (drawn in red). Phelps traces each drawing sold and adds tracing information of the previous buyers and the price to each further generation of a piece. These tracings are mounted to wood with her well known red and green lines marking the economic history of the work.

In 2012, Phelps gained notoriety for The Cost of Love, a 25-panel painting constructed from an 8-page court ruling after a failed attempt to win back her New York apartment from her ex-girlfriend. After three years of co-habitation with her partner and child, Phelp's ex refused to leave their shared apartment. Legal fees and the losing ownership over the property had cost the artist an estimated $350,000, which is referenced in the painting with 350,000 individual red stripes.

She is currently represented by Galerie Judin in Berlin, Werner Klein in Cologne, Hubert Winter in Vienna, Michael Sturm in Stuttgart, Patrick Heide in London, Luis de Jesus in LA, and Oath Contemporary in Tulsa; she was formerly represented by Brennan & Griffin Gallery in New York City.
